This is a list of warships sunk during the Russo-Japanese War.

Causes of Japanese and Russian Warships sunk during the war
Although submarines, torpedoes, torpedo boats, and steel battleships had existed for many years, the Russo-Japanese war was the first conflict to see mature forms of these weapon systems deployed in large numbers.  Over a hundred of the newly invented torpedo boats and nearly the same number of torpedo boat destroyers  were involved.  The Imperial Russian Navy would become the first navy in history to possess an independent operational submarine fleet on 1 January 1905.  With this submarine fleet making its first combat patrol on 14 February 1905, and its first clash with enemy surface warships on 29 April 1905, all this nearly a decade before World War I even began.

During the course of the war, the Imperial Russian Navy (IRN) and the Imperial Japanese Navy (IJN) would launch nearly 300 self-propelled automotive torpedoes at one another.  Dozens of warships would be hit and damaged, but only 1 battleship, 2 armoured cruisers, and 2 destroyers would be permanently sunk (not salvaged).  Another 80 plus warships would be destroyed by the traditional gun, mine, or other cause.  The Russian battleship Oslyabya was the first modern battleship sunk by gunfire alone, and Admiral Rozhestvensky's flagship, the battleship Knyaz Suvorov was the first modern battleship sunk by the new "torpedo" on the high seas.

Vessel type and cause of loss
 Battleships lost to naval gunfire – 3 (plus 1 Coastal Battleship) IRN
 Battleships lost to land/shore batteries – 4 IRN
 Battleships lost to combination of gunfire & torpedoes – 2 IRN
 Battleships lost to strictly torpedoes – 1 IRN
 Battleships lost to mines – 1 IRN/2 (plus 1 Coastal Battleship) IJN
 Cruisers lost to naval gunfire – 5 IRN
 Cruisers lost to land/shore batteries – 3 IRN
 Cruisers lost to mines – 1 IRN/4 IJN
 Destroyers (DDs, GBs, TBDs, TBs) lost to naval gunfire – 6 IRN/3 IJN
 Destroyers (DDs, GBs, TBDs, TBs) lost to shore batteries – 3 IRN
 Destroyers (DDs, GBs, TBDs, TBs) lost to gunfire & torpedoes – 1 IJN
 Destroyers (DDs, GBs, TBDs, TBs) lost to torpedoes – 2 IRN
 Destroyers (DDs, GBs, TBDs, TBs) lost to mines – 3 IRN/3 IJN
 Auxiliary cruisers lost to naval gunfire – 1 IRN
 Auxiliary Cruisers lost to shore batteries – 1 IRN
 Auxiliary Gunboats lost to mines – 1 IJN
 Minelayers lost to shore batteries – 1 IRN
 Minelayers lost to mines – 1 IRN
 Submarines – 3 lost to scuttling & 1 lost by shipwreck IRN (Note: Only IRN submarines were operational during the war)

The above data includes vessels that were sunk and consequently salvaged (raised) and put back into service by either combatant.  Data regarding surface vessels either shipwrecked or scuttled was excluded.

 Imperial Russian Navy (IRN) total losses: 11 Battleships, 1 Coastal Battleship, 9 Cruisers, 14 Destroyers, 2 Auxiliary Cruisers, 2 Minelayers, 4 Submarines.
 Imperial Japanese Navy (IJN) total losses: 2 Battleships, 1 Coastal Battleship, 4 Cruisers, 7 Destroyers, 1 Auxiliary Gunboat.

Japanese warships sunk

Warship type, name, and date of loss
 Battleships
Hatsuse sunk 15 May 1904.
Yashima sunk 15 May 1904.
 Corvettes
Kaimon sunk 5 July 1904
 Cruisers
Miyako sunk 14 May 1904.
Saien sunk 30 November 1904.
Takasago sunk 13 December 1904.
Yoshino sunk 15 May 1904.
 Gunboats
Atago sunk 6 November 1904.
Heien sunk 18 September 1904.
Ōshima sunk 18 May 1904.
 Torpedo boats
 (#34) 27 May 1905
 (#35) 27 May 1905
 (#42) 15 December 1904
 (#48) 12 May 1904
 (#51) 28 June 1904
 (#53) 14 December 1904
 (#69) 27 May 1905
 Torpedo boat destroyers
Akatsuki 17 May 1904
 Hayatori 3 September 1904

Russian warships sunk
From 1880 through the end of the war, Russia prepared a systematic plan to build their navy into a major naval power, able to meet any modern adversary—which during this time period were primarily based in Europe.  By 1884 Russia lead the world in numbers of the newly invented torpedo boats and torpedo boat destroyers with 115 such vessels.  By 1904, the IRN was a first rate navy, but by the end of 1905, Russia was reduced to a third rate naval power.

Warship type, name, and date of loss
The list below excludes captured, surrendered, or sunken warships that were raised and put back into service by either combatant.
 Auxiliary cruisers
Angara 30 October 1904
Ural 27 May 1905
Battleships
Borodino 27 May 1905
Imperator Aleksandr III 27 May 1905
Knyaz Suvorov 27 May 1905
Navarin 28 May 1905
Oslyabya 27 May 1905
Petropavlovsk 13 April 1904
Sevastopol 2 January 1905
Sissoi Veliky 28 May 1905
 Coastal defense ships
Admiral Ushakov 28 May 1905
 Cruisers 
Admiral Nakhimov 28 May 1905
Boyarin12 February 1904
Dmitrii Donskoi 28 May 1905
Izumrud 29 May 1905
Rurik 14 August 1904
Svetlana 28 May 1905
Vladimir Monomakh 28 May 1905
 Gunboats
Bobr 26 December 1904
 Gremyashchi 18 August 1904
Koietz 9 February 1904
Otvajni 2 January 1905
Sivuch 2 August 1904
Zabiyaka 25 October
 Minelayers  
Amur 18 December
Yenisei 11 February 1904
 Repair ships 
Kamchatka 27 May 1905
 Sloops 
 Djigit 2 January 1905
 Razboinik 2 January 1905
 Torpedo Boat Destroyers 
Bditelni 2 January 1905
Bezuprechni 28 May 1905
Blestyashtchi 28 May 1905
Boevoi 2 January 1905
Buinyi 28 May 1905
Buistri 28 May 1905
Burni 11 August 1904
Gromki 28 May 1905
Leitenant Burakov 24 July 1904
Rastoropni 16 November 1904
Razyashchi 2 January 1905
Ryeshitelni 11 August 1904
Silni 2 January 1905
Strashni 13 April 1904
Steregushchi 19 March 1904
Stroini 13 November 1904
Storozhevoi 2 January 1905
Vnimatelni 26 May 1904
Vuinoslivi 24 August 1904
Vnushitelni 25 February 1904
 Torpedo boats
Tantchikhe (#201) 21 August 1904
(#202) 1 October 1904
 Ussuri (#204) 30 June 1904
(#208) 13 July 1904
Torpedo gunboats 
 Guidamak 2 January 1905
 Vsadnik 15 December 1904

Russian ships captured, repaired and recommissioned by Japan
 Battleships
Imperator Nikolai I recommissioned as the Iki.
Oryol recommissioned as the Iwami.
Peresvet recommissioned as the Sagami.  Returned to Russia in 1916.
Pobeda recommissioned as the Suwo.
Poltava recommissioned as the Tango.  Returned to Russia in 1916.
Retvizan recommissioned as the Hizen.
Coastal defense ships 
Admiral Seniavin recommissioned as the Mishima.
General-Admiral Apraksin recommissioned as the Okinoshima.
 Cruisers 
Bayan recommissioned as the Aso.
Novik recommissioned as the Suzuya.
Pallada recommissioned as the Tsugaru.
Varyag recommissioned as the Soya.  Returned to Russia in 1916.
Destroyers
Bedovyi recommissioned as the Satsuki.
Ryeshitelni (former Kondor) recommissioned as the Ataksuki, later renamed the Yamabiko.
Sil‘nyi recommissioned as the Fumizuki.

References

Bibliography
 
 
 

Warships sunk
Russo-Japanese
Russo-Japanese War